Aubigné (Gallo: Aubeinyae) is a commune located in the Ille-et-Vilaine department in Brittany in northwestern France.

Population

Inhabitants of Aubigné are called Aubinois in French.

See also
Communes of the Ille-et-Vilaine department

References
INSEE commune page

External links 

Mayors of Ille-et-Vilaine Association 

Communes of Ille-et-Vilaine